Weapon, in comics, may refer to:

 The Weapon (comics), a series from Platinum Comics written by Fred Van Lente
 Weapon (DC Comics), a DC Comics character
 Weapon Alpha (comics), a Marvel Comics character better known as the Guardian
 Weapon Omega, an alias used by the Marvel Comics character Michael Pointer
 Weapon Plus, a clandestine program in the Marvel Universe designed to create superhumans
 Weapon X, part of the Weapon Plus program
 Weapon Zero, two titles by the Image Comics imprint Top Cow

It may also refer to:
Weapons of the Gods (comics) a Hong Kong comics series
Weaponers of Qward, a group in the DC Comics Universe, enemies of the Green Lantern Corps

See also
Weapon (disambiguation)